Baku State University (BSU) is a public university located in Baku, Azerbaijan. Established in 1919 by the Parliament of Azerbaijan Democratic Republic, the university started with faculties of history and philology, physics and mathematics, and law and medicine, with an initial enrollment of 1094. The first rector of BSU was V.I.Razumovsky, a former professor of surgery at Kazan University.

In 1930, the government ordered the university shut down in accordance with a reorganization of higher education, and the university was replaced with the Supreme Pedagogical Institute. However, in 1934 the university was reestablished again and continued to work through the difficult years of World War II experiencing a shortage of faculty members.

By its 40th anniversary in 1959, the university already had 13 faculties. The Azerbaijan Medical University and Azerbaijan State Economic University were both spun-offs of the original respective faculties at BSU.

Among the graduates of BSU were two former presidents of Azerbaijan, Abulfaz Elchibey and Heydar Aliyev. The former graduated from the Faculty of Arabic Language and Literature, while the latter, who dominated Azerbaijan's political life for over 30 years, from the Faculty of History. Nobel Prize-winning physicist Lev Landau studied at BSU between 1922 and 1924.

BSU is the only university from Azerbaijan ranked by international ranking organizations, such as University Ranking by Academic Performance and currently ranks at 1872 in the University Ranking by Academic Performance.

History

BSU was established on September 1, 1919, by the decision of the Parliament of Azerbaijan Democratic Republic. The university was established as a part of 4 faculties (history and philology, physics and mathematics, lawing, and medicine). The first rector of the university was the famous surgeon V. I. Razumovsky.

Among the leading professors in 1920-40 were Azerbaijani writer Abdurrahim bek Haqverdiyev, Orientalist Professor P.K. Juze, Professor A.O. Makovelski, Professor A.O. Mishel and other scholars. During that period the administration of the university invited to Baku such teachers as N.Y. Marr, V.V. Bartold, the academician of the Eastern Science Academy Fuad bek Kuprulluzade.

The university was liquidated in 1930 in accordance with the decision made by the Council of the People's Commissar on reorganization. The High Pedagogical Institute was created as a replacement. The university resumed its activity in 1934 and soon became the republic's scientific-pedagogical center. Despite the shortage of university teachers caused by their service in the Second World War, the university managed to maintain its leading position. In 1945 the teachers took an active part in founding the Azerbaijan Academy of Science. The majority of the republic's top universities — such as Azerbaijan Medical University, Azerbaijan University of Economy, Azerbaijan State Pedagogical University and others — were founded on the basis of Baku State University.

The years following 1969 can be considered as a period of further development in the direction of knowledge and science. Faculties on modern specialties, departments and about 30 scientific research laboratories were founded during this period of time. University continued to grow and develop under the presidency of Heydar Aliyev, with further specialties, departments, and scientific laboratories beginning their operation. Given its extensive historical background, Baku State University was always a major scientific and educational center in Azerbaijan. Famous scientists, intellectuals and politicians and Azerbaijan's outstanding politician, Heydar Aliyev graduated from Baku State University. As of May 2021, Baku State University offers 16 majors with 55 bachelor and 153 master's degrees.

The 100th anniversary of Baku State University was commemorated throughout during the year 2019 in Azerbaijan and also in Vienna, Austria (September 2019) and at the headquarter of UNESCO in Paris (June 2019). A special medal in honor of the 100th anniversary of BSU - “The 100th jubilee (1919-2019) medal of Baku State University” was issued by the Presidential Decree in November 2019, with 113 people being subsequently awarded this Medal.

International relations 
Currently, BSU is a member of various associations and institutions such as the Association of Universities of Eurasia, which unites most universities of the former USSR. Between 2002 and 2004, BSU led the Association of Universities of Black Sea States. The university has also signed agreements on scientific and technical cooperation and student-teacher exchange programs with the Moscow State University, Middle East Technical University, Nice-Sofia Antipole University, Indiana University, Kyiv National University, Vienna University, and several other high-ranking institutions.

As a result of these initiatives, the university holds joint scientific conferences, workshops, and publishes textbooks.

Faculties and institutes

Faculties
 Faculty of Applied Mathematics and Cybernetics
 Faculty of Physics
 Faculty of Mechanics and Mathematics
 Faculty of Chemistry
 Faculty of Biology
 Faculty of Ecology and Soil Science
 Faculty of Geology
 Faculty of Geography
 Faculty of History
 Faculty of Philology
 Faculty of International Relations and Economics
 Faculty of Journalism
 Faculty of Law
 Faculty of Oriental Studies
 Faculty of Social Sciences and Psychology
 Faculty of Information and Document Management.

Rectors  
 Vasily Razumovsky (1919-1920)
 Sergey Nikolayevich Davidenkov (1920-1923)
 Alexander Dmitrievich Gulyayev (1923-1926)
 TAGI Shahbazi Simurg (1926-1929)
 Vladimir Yelpatyevsky (1929)
 Magsud Mammadov (1929-1930)
 Mammadkazim Alakbarli (1934-1935)
 Bala Bey Hasanbeyov (1935-1937)
 Aziz Aliyev (1937)
 Jabrayil Alasgarov (1937-1941)
 Shamil Aliyev (1941-1944)
 Abdulla Garayev (1944-1950)
 Jafar Hajiyev (1950-1954)
 Yusif Mammadaliyev (1954-1958)
 Shafayat Mehdiyev (1958-1965)
 Mehdi Aliyev (1965-1970)
 Faig Bagirzade (1970-1987)
 Yahya Mammadov (1987-1989)
 Jamil Guliyev (1989-1990)
 Mirabbas Gasimov (1990-1992)
 Firudin Samandarov (1992-1993)
 Murtuz Alasgarov (1993-1996)
 Misir Mardanov (1996-1998)
 Abel Maharramov (1999-2018)
 Firudin Gurbanov (2018-2019) 
 Elchin Babayev (2019 — )

Research institutes
 Scientific Research Institute of Applied Mathematics
 Institute of Problems of Theoretical Physics

Affiliations
The university is a member of the Caucasus University Association.

Alumni 
See for more information on: 
Abulfaz Elchibey - 2nd President of Azerbaijan
Heydar Aliyev - 3rd President of Azerbaijan
Lev Landau - theoretical physicist
Mikayil Jabbarov - current Minister of Economу of the Republic of Azerbaijan
Anar Baghirov - lawyer
Intigam Aliyev - human rights defender
Ali Omarov - Prosecutor General of the Republic of Azerbaijan
Aslan Aslanov - Director General of the Azerbaijan State Telegraph Agency
Vougar Aslanov - writer and journalist
Rauf Mirgadirov - journalist
Arif Yunus - historian
Alec Rasizade - Azerbaijani-American professor of history and political science
Alik Ismail-Zadeh - mathematical geophysicist

See also
List of universities and colleges in Azerbaijan

References

External links

 Official website 

 
1919 establishments in Azerbaijan
Educational institutions established in 1919
Science and technology in Azerbaijan
Universities in Baku